Dannis Peary (born August 8, 1949) is an American film critic and sports writer. He has written and edited many books on cinema and sports-related topics. Peary is most famous for his book Cult Movies (1980), which spawned two sequels, Cult Movies 2 (1983) and Cult Movies 3 (1988) and are all credited for providing more public interest in the cult movie phenomenon.

He is the brother of film critic, columnist, actor, and documentary filmmaker Gerald Peary.

Early life and education
Peary was born in Philippi, West Virginia to Laura Chaitan and Joseph Y. Peary, a professor. During his childhood, he moved to South Carolina, and then New Jersey. In 1971, he earned a B.A. in history from the University of Wisconsin in Madison. He also worked as a film critic for the Daily Cardinal student newspaper. In 1975, he earned an M.A. in cinema, with honors, at the University of Southern California. While attending USC, he worked as the fine arts and sports editor for L.A. Panorama.

Personal life
Since 1977, Peary has lived in New York City. He and his wife Suzanne have a daughter, Zoe.

Career

Film criticism
Over the years, his film criticism has been published in FilmInk, Movieline, Satellite Direct, OnDirect TV, TV Guide, Canadian TV Guide, Cosmopolitan, The New York Times, the New York Daily News, The Boston Globe, Sports Collectors Digest, the SoHo News, The Philadelphia Bulletin, Films in Focus, Films and Filming, Slant, L.A. Panorama, Memories and Dreams, The East Hampton Independent, and Country Weekly, as well as The Velvet Light Trap and Newsday, and the Sag Harbor Express.  He conducts celebrity interviews for Dan's Papers, in a column called "Danny Peary Talks To..."

Cult Movies books
In 1981, Peary released his book Cult Movies. He followed it up with Cult Movies 2 in 1983 and Cult Movies 3 in 1989. (See bibliography) These books cover critically ignored (at the time) cult films. Each book contained an essay for each film (100 in the first volume, 50 in the second, and 50 in the third), including production details and information gleaned from Peary's interviews with various producers, directors and actors. Each volume contained an essay by contributor Henry Blinder. 

Peary also wrote Guide for the Film Fanatic (1986), reviewing a wider range of films.

Peary's Cult Movies trilogy, along with other touchstones such as Michael Weldon's Psychotronic Video magazine and books, helped establish a foundation for critical analysis of low-budget genre movies. As the Austin Film Society wrote,

Sportswriting
Peary has co-authored books with Major League baseball player-sportscasters Ralph Kiner and Tim McCarver; writer Tom Clavin; Olympic gold medalist and cancer survivor Shannon Miller on her memoir; and Muhammad Ali's daughter Hana Ali on a book about the origins of her father's greatest quotes. He has edited sports books including Baseball Immortal Derek Jeter: A Career in Quotes and Jackie Robinson in Quotes: The Remarkable Life of Baseball's Most Significant Player. (See bibliography)

Television career

Animated series
Peary wrote an episode of the 1985-1989 animated series ThunderCats, titled "The Mountain." He wrote an episode of SilverHawks, titled "Undercover", that aired October 28, 1986.

Sports-related television
Peary was a writer for the nationally syndicated sports-interview TV show The Tim McCarver Show

Media appearances
Peary was interviewed for the 2010 documentary Machete Maidens Unleashed!. The director of the film, Mark Hartley, has said that, "I'd worn my copies of Cult Movies 1, 2 and 3 into the ground from constant re-reading so meeting author Danny Peary was a pleasure." He appears in James Westby's documentary At the Video Store (2019), and in the cult-movie documentary Time Warp (2020.

Bibliography

Books
 ISBN 0440516471 and 978-0440516477
 ISBN 0440516323 and 978-0440516323
 ISBN 0671610813 and 978-0671610814
 ISBN  0671648101 and 978-0671648107
 ISBN  0671749242 and 978-0671749248
 ISBN 0385303327 and 978-0385303323
 ISBN 1584793546 and 9781584793540

Co-author
 ISBN 067167580X and 978-0671675806
 ISBN 0375753400 and 978-0375753404
 ISBN 0375503307 and 978-0375503306
 ISBN 1580174477 and 978-1580174473 
 ISBN 1572435976 and 978-1572435971
 ISBN 1416589287 and 978-1416589280
 ISBN 9780451235862)
 ISBN 1250049865 and 978-1250049865
 ISBN 1523503467 and 978-1523503469

Editor
Close-Ups: The Movie Star Book (1978)
Omni's Screen Flights/Screen Fantasies: The Future According to Science Fiction Cinema (1984)
Cult Baseball Players: The Greats, the Flakes, the Weird and the Wonderful (1990)
We Played the Game: 65 Players Remember Baseball's Greatest Era, 1947-1964  (1994)
Super Bowl: The Game of Their Lives (1997)
 ISBN 1624141625 and 978-1624141621
 ISBN 1624142443 and 978-1624142444

Co-editor
The American Animated Cartoon: A Critical Anthology (1980), with Gerald Peary
Great Golf: 150 Years of Essential Instruction from the Best Players, Teachers, and Writers of All Time  (2005), with Allen Richardson
Tim McCarver's Diamond Gems (2008), with Tim McCarver and Jim Moskovitz

References

External links
 Danny Peary's blog
 
 Guide for the Film Fanatic fan site

1949 births
Living people
American film critics
American sportswriters
FilmInk people
University of Wisconsin–Madison College of Letters and Science alumni
USC School of Cinematic Arts alumni